This is a list of supermarket chains in Algeria.

The Algerian chain Ardis (owned by Algerian group Arcofina) is currently operating one hypermarket in the country in Mohammedia just outside Algiers. In the future Ardis will open 19 hypermarkets in the country, the next hypermarket will open near Oran in Bir El Djir. Carrefour ended their partnership with the Algerian group Arcofina on February 19, 2009. "The concept of mass distribution does not work in Algeria," added Carrefour. Before that, Carrefour had still only one store opened as of 2009, of 18 hypermarkets planned by 2012. The private group Arcofina explained that there was a delay because of difficulties in finding available land for hypermarkets. Arcofina is now focusing on opening hypermarkets in the future under the Ardis brand.

List of current Algerian supermarket chains

See also
 List of supermarket chains in Africa
 List of supermarket chains
 List of hypermarkets in Algeria

References

External links
 Grocery retailers in Algeria
 Shopping in Algeria

Algeria
Business in Algeria
Supermarkets of Algeria
Supermarket chains
Algeria